St. Paul's Basilica is the oldest Roman Catholic congregation in Toronto, Ontario, Canada. It is located at 83 Power Street in the Corktown neighbourhood, just east of downtown, near the intersection of Queen and Parliament streets.

History
The parish was established in 1822 by James Baby, when the Town of York was part of the Diocese of Kingston, and it was the only Roman Catholic parish between Kingston and Windsor. The original church building was completed on the current site in 1824. It was constructed of red brick in the Gothic Revival style.

To serve the expanding Irish immigrant community, a school opened soon after the church.  When the Diocese of Toronto was separated from the Diocese of Kingston in 1842, St. Paul's served as the pro-cathedral until St. Michael's Cathedral was completed in 1848.

The church is housed in a Romanesque Revival structure that was designed by Joseph Connolly and opened in 1889. It is based on the design of the Basilica of Saint Paul Outside the Walls in Rome.  The new building was necessary to house the growing congregation.

Inside this church, located in the north transept, a stained-glass window depicts St. Paul holding a sword – with dedication to William Joseph O'Connor, a professional oarsman who grew up in the neighbourhood where the church is located. The Italianate campanile (bell tower) was built in 1905 and contains the bell from the original church.

The first Catholic cemetery in Toronto opened east of the church in 1822.  The large increase in the Catholic population caused by Irish immigration quickly filled the cemetery to capacity, and it was replaced by St. Michael's Cemetery in 1857. The site of the old cemetery is now the parking lot and playground area for St. Paul's Catholic School.

The church was designated a minor basilica by Pope John Paul II in 1999.

Plaque

In popular culture
In Short Circuit 2, Johnny Five went into a church, which is renamed as St Katherine's Church.

See also
List of Roman Catholic churches in Toronto
William Joseph O'Connor

References

Further reading
"Landmark restored." Zosia Bielski. National Post. April 1, 2006. Page A16.

External links

Official website
St. Paul's Basilica Parish
Corktown history

Roman Catholic churches in Toronto
Roman Catholic churches in Ontario
Paul
Roman Catholic Archdiocese of Toronto
Renaissance Revival architecture in Canada
1822 establishments in Canada